Ebbe Glacier is a tributary glacier about  long, draining northwest from the Homerun Range and the Robinson Heights, and then west-northwest between the Everett Range and the Anare Mountains into Lillie Glacier, Victoria Land, Antarctica. This feature saddles with Tucker Glacier, the latter draining southeast to the Ross Sea.  The glacier lies situated on the Pennell Coast, a portion of Antarctica lying between Cape Williams and Cape Adare.  Robertson Glacier is a tributary glacier to Ebbe Glacier.

It was mapped by the United States Geological Survey from surveys and from air photos by US Navy Squadron VX-6, 1960–62, and was named by the Advisory Committee on Antarctic Names for Commander Gordon K. Ebbe, commanding officer of Squadron VX-6 from June 1955 to June 1956.

See also
 List of glaciers in the Antarctic
 Glaciology

References 

Glaciers of Pennell Coast